Amphiodia habilis is a species of brittle star belonging to the family Amphiuridae. It is only known from a single locality off the coast of southeastern Brazil, near the mouth of the Doce River.

This brittle star, with a disc diameter of 3.5 mm and arm length of 20 mm, can be most readily distinguished from congeners by the thick disc with large armoured plates on the upperside.

References

habilis
Animals described in 2001